Smart Woman is a 1948 romantic drama film directed by Edward A. Blatt and starring Brian Aherne, Constance Bennett, and Barry Sullivan.

Plot
When a grand jury becomes dissatisfied with the efforts of District Attorney Bradley Wayne (Otto Kruger), it requests a special prosecutor, Robert Larrimore (Brian Aherne).

Wayne, who is in league with crime boss Frank McCoy (Barry Sullivan), assigns Larrimore the difficult Johnson case. McCoy blackmails the best defense lawyer around, Paula Rogers (Constance Bennett), into defending Johnson. When Larrimore's assistant, Sam Corkle (James Gleason), tracks down a crucial witness intimidated into hiding, McCoy tells Rogers to plead her client guilty.

Afterward, Larrimore begins dating Rogers. The couple make it into the newspapers, in between stories of Larrimore's successes against the crime syndicate.

Larrimore's investigation points to a Dr. Jasper, the one man who can identify the shadowy head of the syndicate.  When Jasper goes into hiding from both sides, McCoy pressures Rogers to spy on her boyfriend. She finds a telegram with valuable information, but does not pass it along the gangster.

Meanwhile, Larrimore gives the crooked district attorney an ultimatum: either betray his partner in crime or face an indictment in 24 hours. When an attack on Larrimore is foiled, Wayne summons McCoy and shows him the gun used to kill Jasper. He offers McCoy $100,000 to put his fingerprints on it and flee the country for a while, just until the pressure subsides. When McCoy refuses, Wayne grabs the gun and states he can shoot McCoy and plead self-defense. In the ensuing struggle, the gun goes off, killing Wayne. Mrs. Wayne (Selena Royle), eavesdropping from outside the room, faints. McCoy is arrested and charged with first degree murder.

Rogers very reluctantly defends McCoy, knowing him to be incapable of murder (if little else). The trial goes badly. Mrs. Wayne perjures herself on the witness stand to protect the family's reputation, and states that McCoy gunned down her husband in cold blood. As a desperate last resort, Rogers puts herself on the stand as a character witness. She reveals that she was once married to the defendant and concealed the fact to protect their son Rusty. Larrimore sees that Mrs. Wayne is visibly affected by the testimony, so he goes to see her later and has her re-enact the crime. He discovers she did not have her glasses on that night and, as a result, could not have seen what happened. He gets her to sign a statement to that effect.
Larrimore then overcomes Rogers' desire to break up with him to shield him from the scandal, and the couple reconcile.

Cast
 Brian Aherne as Robert Larrimore
 Constance Bennett as Paula Rogers
 Barry Sullivan as Frank McCoy
 Michael O'Shea as Johnny Simons
 James Gleason as Sam Corkle
 Otto Kruger as District Attorney Bradley Wayne
 Isobel Elsom as Mrs. Rogers
 Richard Lyon as Rusty Rogers
 Selena Royle as Mrs. Wayne
 Taylor Holmes as Dr. Jasper
 John Litel as Clark
 Nita Hunter as Patty Wayne

References

External links
 
 
 
 

American crime drama films
American romantic drama films
American black-and-white films
1948 romantic drama films
1948 films
1948 crime drama films
Allied Artists films
1940s American films